Tyuleniy Island, Tyuleny Island or Tyuleniy Islands may refer to:
Tyuleny Island (Caspian Sea)
Tyuleniy Archipelago (Kazakhstan)
Tyuleny Island (Sea of Okhotsk)
Tyulen'i Islands (Antarctica)